Council elections for the Borough of Chorley were held on 2 May 2019 as part of the 2019 United Kingdom local elections.

All locally registered electors (British, Irish, Commonwealth and European Union citizens) who are aged 18 or over on polling day are entitled to vote in the local elections.

The result was a hold for the ruling Labour group.

Results summary

The results of the 2019 elections are summarised below.

Ward results

Adlington & Anderton

Astley & Buckshaw

Chisnall

Chorley East

Chorley North East

Chorley North West

Chorley South East

Chorley South West

Clayton-le-Woods North

Clayton-le-Woods West & Cuerden

Clayton-le-Woods & Whittle-le-Woods

Coppull

Eccleston & Mawdesley

Euxton South

Lostock

References

2019 English local elections
May 2019 events in the United Kingdom
2019
2010s in Lancashire